The Texas Federal Service Medal, formerly the Texas Service Medal, is the highest campaign/service award that may be issued to a service member of the Texas Military Forces. Subsequent awards are issued by a silver star device.

Eligibility
The Federal Service Medal shall be issued to any service member of the Texas Military Forces who: 

 Was mobilized into service under command of the United States Armed Forces (Title 10)
 From 15 June 1940 to 1 January 1946 or after 1 June 1950
 For more than 90 days

Authority
The Texas Federal Service Medal was formerly designated the Texas Service Medal. It was originally authorized by the Forty-third Texas Legislature in House Concurrent Resolution Number 37 during the first called session and approved by Governor Miriam A. Ferguson on 17 October 1933. It was authorized in its present form by the Fifty-eighth Texas Legislature in Senate Bill Number 279 and approved by Governor John Connally on 3 May 1963, effective 23 August 1963.

Description

Medal 
The medal pendant is of bronze, 1-1/4 of an inch in diameter. On the obverse side of the pendant is the Alamo, with limbs of a tree containing five bloom clusters on the upper left and scattered clouds on the upper right, encircled by the words "TEXAS SERVICE MEDAL" along the upper arc and "FOR SERVICE" along the lower arc. On the reverse side of the pendant is a five-pointed raised star, one point up, 1/2 of an inch in diameter, surrounded by a wreath formed by an olive branch on the right, and a live oak branch on the left, encircled by the words "TEXAS NATIONAL GUARD" along the upper arc and "FOR SERVICE" along the lower arc, in raised letters. The pendant is suspended by a ring from a silk moiré ribbon, 1-3/8 inches long and 1-3/8 inches wide, composed of stripes of golden yellow (1/8 of an inch), red (1/16 of an inch), blue (3/16 of an inch), green (5/8 of an inch), blue (3/16 of an inch), red (1/16 of an inch) and golden yellow (1/8 of an inch).

Device 
A five-pointed Silver Star, 3/16 of an inch in circumscribing diameter, is issued to be worn to denote second and succeeding awards of the Texas Federal Service Medal. Stars will be worn centered on the suspension ribbon and service ribbon, with one point up. If four stars are worn on the suspension ribbon (on the full size or miniature Texas Federal Service Medal) the fourth one will be placed above the middle one in the row of three. A maximum of four stars will be worn.

Notable recipients

See also 

 Awards and decorations of the Texas Military
 Awards and decorations of the Texas government

 Texas Military Forces
 Texas Military Department
 List of conflicts involving the Texas Military

References

Texas

Texas Military Department
Texas Military Forces